The Tatra KTNF6 is a modernized tram, type KT4, rebuilt with a central low-floor segment. These types of tram cars are used in Cottbus, in Brandenburg City and Schöneiche-Rüdersdorf, Germany, and in Tallinn, Estonia (as KT6T). Another similar variant of KT4 is KTNF8 (also called KT4NF), which is used in Gera (Germany).

These trams have new interiors, chairs, doors and middle sections with low floors.

The breakdown of the type designation is as follows:
K implies articulated
T indicates a powered vehicle
NF for Low Floor
6/8 is the number of axles.

See also
 Tatra KT4

References

External links

 Tatra KTNF6 Technical data at trampicturebook.de
 Tatra KTNF8 Technical data at trampicturebook.de

Tatra trams
Tram vehicles of Estonia
Tram vehicles of Germany

de:Tatra KT4#KTNF6 und KTNF8
no:Tatra KT4#KT6NF og KTNF8
pl:Tatra KT4#KTNF6 i KTNF8